Spirit Mound Historic Prairie is a state park of South Dakota, USA, featuring a prominent hill on the Great Plains. The Plains Indians of the region considered Spirit Mound the home of dangerous spirits or little people; members of the Lewis and Clark Expedition climbed it on August 25, 1804. The park was established in 2002.

Spirit Mound
Stories and religious beliefs about "Little People" are common to many if not most Native American tribes in the West. In 1804, the Lewis and Clark Expedition stayed for a time with a band of Wičhíyena Sioux on the Vermillion River in modern-day South Dakota. The Sioux said that the devils carried sharp arrows which could strike at a very long distance, and that they killed anyone who approached their mound. The Little People so terrified the local population, Lewis reported, that the Maha (Omaha), Ottoes (Otoe), and Sioux would not go near the place. The Lakota people who came to live near the "Spirit Mound" after the Wičhíyena Sioux have a story no more than 250 years old which describes how a band of 350 warriors came near the mound late at night and were nearly wiped out by the ferocious Little People (the survivors were crippled for life).

Due to extensive damming of the Missouri River, Spirit Mound is one of the few places which historians can identify as precisely a spot upon which Lewis and Clark stood.

History
Spirit Mound was in private hands for many decades, leading to extensive degradation of the site's original status. White settlers first came to the area in 1868, and used it for grazing livestock and for farming. Five separate landowners owned parts of the site in the early 1980s.

Several local citizens formed the Spirit Mound Trust in 1986 in an attempt to preserve the site. The group received funding boosts and publicity with the 1996 publication of the book Undaunted Courage (about the Lewis and Clark Expedition) and the 1997 Ken Burns documentary Lewis & Clark: The Journey of the Corps of Discovery. After years of lobbying, the federal government's Land and Water Conservation Fund provided $600,000 to acquire the site. The donation required that the State of South Dakota establish the site as a state park, while the Spirit Mound Trust would restore it, provide interpretational signage and tours, and raise $500,000 for the site's long-term preservation. The  site was purchased from the private landowners in 2001. On July 29, 2001, Senator Tim Johnson presented a symbolic check for $600,000 for the purchase of Spirit Mound and the surrounding land.

In 2004 the United States Department of the Interior designated the trail leading to the summit of Spirit Mound as a National Recreation Trail.

The Spirit Mound Creek runs right past the Mound, on its southern side.

Some controversy has surrounded the establishment of the state park. In 2001 a few local Native American leaders expressed dismay that a site sacred and terrifying to local tribes would be treated as a "fun" place to visit.

See also
Missouri National Recreational River

References

External links

Spirit Mound Historic Prairie
Spirit Mound Trust
Spirit Mound - Missouri National Recreational River
Spirit Mound--Lewis and Clark Expedition (National Park Service)

2001 establishments in South Dakota
Grasslands of South Dakota
Grasslands of the North American Great Plains
Indigenous culture of the Great Plains
Hills of the United States
Landforms of Clay County, South Dakota
Lewis and Clark Expedition
National Register of Historic Places in Clay County, South Dakota
Native American history of South Dakota
Natural features on the National Register of Historic Places
Protected areas established in 2001
Protected areas of Clay County, South Dakota
Religious places of the indigenous peoples of North America
State parks of South Dakota